VCHS may refer to:

Valley Christian High School:
 Valley Christian High School (Arizona), Chandler, Arizona
 Valley Christian High School (Cerritos, California), Cerritos, California
 Valley Christian High School (Dublin, California), Dublin, California
 Valley Christian High School (San Jose, California), San Jose, California
 Valley Christian High School (Montana), Missoula, Montana
 Valley Christian High School (Texas), Brownsville, Texas
 Valley Christian High School (Wisconsin), Oshkosh, Wisconsin

 Valley Christian Schools (Ohio), Youngstown, Ohio
 Valley Christian Heritage School, in Alamo, Texas